This list of episodes of Conan details information on the episodes spanning from 2010–2011, of Conan, a television program on TBS hosted by Conan O'Brien. A week of shows were taped at the Beacon Theatre in New York City during October 31—November 3, 2011.

2010

November

December

2011

January

February

March

April

May

June

July

August

September

October

November

December

Notes
Although she was billed in the opening sequence of the May 11, 2011 show as the musical guest, Kesha did not perform; rather, she made an appearance as a traditional guest.
Nate Bargatze's scheduled appearance on July 21, 2011 was cancelled. He instead performed on August 10, 2011.
In the opening of multiple episodes in August 2011, Steve Zampanides was listed as a guest to appear in the broadcast, but in all instances his appearance was delayed to the next episode, supposedly due to time limitations. In the beginning of the episodes, he is billed as having a different unusual skill, such as "font expert" and "shark whisperer". His name did not appear on the weekly schedules posted on the official website of the show and no promotional links that referenced him were provided; given this information, there is no indication that he was ever intended to be an actual guest or is even an actual person.
Although they only constitute part of the band, Dave Grohl and Taylor Hawkins were billed in the opening sequence as the Foo Fighters. Later they performed, along with the rest of the band, as the musical guests.
On the November 3, 2011 show, Triumph the Insult Comic Dog was billed in the opening sequence as a guest to appear on the show. While the character did make an appearance on the show, he did so only in a video segment and in a cameo appearance during the filming of the show; he did not make a traditional guest appearance. Additionally, Scott Cronick and David Gorshein were billed under the event "The Wedding of Scott and David" and their wedding took place during the traditional musical or entertainment guest segment of the show.

References

Episodes (2010-2011)
Lists of variety television series episodes

tr:Conan bölümleri listesi